Chirag Jayeshkumar Gandhi (born 18 June 1990) is an Indian first-class cricketer who plays for Gujarat cricket team. He is also called CJ Gandhi. He is a Right-hand batsman and Right-arm off break bowler.

He has been in the Gujarat team since 2011. He made his first debut in a first-class match against Mumbai at age of 21.

Early life 
Chirag Gandhi was born on 18 June 1990 in Surat into a Gujarati Hindu family. His father, Jayeshkumar Gandhi, is a businessman and his mother, Rupalben is a homemaker. Chirag Gandhi loved to play cricket from his early childhood. Considering his love for cricket, his father put him in a Cricket coaching academy at the age of eight. His father always believed that Chirag can be a good cricketer so he inspired and supported him to make his career in Cricket. Chirag Gandhi was raised in Surat and completed his schooling from M T Jariwala High School and In 2010, he has taken his B.com degree from SPB English Medium College of Commerce, Surat.  

After graduation, he started his Government job in department of Post in Surat and after working for 3 years, in 2014 he appointed in Income tax Department in Ahmedabad.

Youth and domestic career 
Chirag Gandhi  made his domestic limited-overs debut in 2011 at the age of 21. His first-class debut in a game against Mumbai in the Ranji trophy that trickled over from December 2012 into January 2013. He has scored a total 1409 runs first-class matches. In February 2011, he made his List A debut from Vijay Hazare Trophy at Indore and scored 21 in his debut innings against Bengal and his first T20 debut in 2011 from Syed Mushtaq Ali Trophy.

Chirag Gandhi has played total First Class Number of Matches - 26, Innings - 42, Not Out - 8, Runs - 1409, HS - 169, BF - 2523, SR - 55.84, 100s - 1, 50s - 10. Chirag Gandhi scored 169 runs with 22 4s and 2 6s in Irani Cup in 2017 against Rest of India at Mumbai.

Chirag Gandhi is not only a batsman but a good bowler too. His bowling has a special trick to cut off the opponent team and has been part of many Test matches, ODI, T20I and T20.

References

External links

Chirag Gandhi at Cricbuzz

1990 births
Living people
Indian cricketers
Gujarat cricketers
People from Surat